Roman Holiday is a 2017 South Korean comedy-drama film directed by Lee Duk-hee.

Plot summary

Cast
 Im Chang-jung as In-han 
 Gong Hyung-jin as Gi-joo
 Jung Sang-hoon as Doo-man
 Kang Shin-il as Chief Ahn
 Kang Da-hyun as High school student
 Ha Do-kwon as Detective Lee
 Han So-young 
 Yuk Jin-soo
 Bang Jun-ho as Tae-jeon
 Park Woo-joon as Commando 4 
 Ko Dong-wook as Jeon-bong

References

External links
 
 
 

2017 films
South Korean comedy-drama films
2010s South Korean films